Cecile van der Merwe (born 16 April 1987), is a South African chess player and Woman International Master (WIM, 2004).

Biography
In 2001, in Cairo she finished 4th in the African Women's Chess Championship. In 2003, in Abuja, she finished 2nd in the African Women's Chess Championship. In 2003, she played for South Africa in the World Girls' Junior Chess Championship and finished in 16th place. In 2004, Cecile van der Merwe participated in the Women's World Chess Championship by knock-out system and lost in the first round to Humpy Koneru.

Cecile van der Merwe has played for South Africa in the following events:
 Women's Chess Olympiad - participated 4 times (2000-2004, 2012);
 Women's World Team Chess Championship - participated in 2011;
 All-Africa Games chess tournament - participated in 2003 and won the team silver medal and individual gold medal.

In 2004, she was awarded the FIDE International Women Master title.

References

External links
 

Cecile van der Merwe chess games at 365Chess.com

1987 births
Living people
South African female chess players
Chess Woman International Masters
Chess Olympiad competitors
African Games medalists in chess
Competitors at the 2003 All-Africa Games
African Games gold medalists for South Africa
African Games silver medalists for South Africa
20th-century South African women
21st-century South African women